Toqué! is a restaurant in Montreal, Quebec, Canada. It is located at 900 Place Jean-Paul Riopelle in the CDP Capital Centre in the Quartier international neighbourhood of the Ville-Marie borough.

Toqué! offers French cuisine using locally sourced products.

History
Toqué was founded in 1993 by Normand Laprise and Christine Lamarche. The original restaurant was located on Saint Denis Street, and could accommodate 55 people. Seeking a larger space, it moved to the newly built CDP Capital Centre in 2004.

In 2006, Toqué became a member of Relais & Châteaux. It also received the CAA/AAA Five Diamond Award.

Brasserie T!

Brasserie T! was established by Laprise and Lamarche in 2010 on the Place des festivals in Montreal's Quartier des spectacles. It is owned by Laprise and Lamarche, and led by executive chef Charles-Antoine Crête. Brasserie T! is a sister restaurant to Toqué and offers brasserie-style food.

References

External links
Official website - Toqué
Official website - Brasserie T!

1993 establishments in Quebec
Downtown Montreal
Restaurants established in 1993
Restaurants in Montreal